Isadora Magalhaes Silva (born ) is a Brazilian group rhythmic gymnast. She represents her nation at international competitions. She competed at world championships, including at the 2014 World Rhythmic Gymnastics Championships.

References

1997 births
Living people
Brazilian rhythmic gymnasts
Place of birth missing (living people)